Gail Radcliffe O'Day (2 December 1954 – 22 September 2018) was an American biblical scholar.

Early life and education
O'Day was born in Muhlenberg, New Jersey, on 2 December 1954, while her father Arthur F. O'Day served in the Korean War. Upon the end of his military service, Arthur and his wife Sally Wilcox O'Day moved to her hometown, Scituate, Massachusetts. The family moved to Chappaqua, New York,  in 1965, where O'Day was a student at Horace Greeley High School. She earned a bachelor's of arts degree at Brown University in 1976, followed by a Master of Theological Studies from Harvard Divinity School and a Ph.D. in New Testament from Emory University. O'Day's research on the New Testament focused on the Gospel of John.

Career
O'Day was an ordained minister of the United Church of Christ. She taught at Hamilton College and Eden Theological Seminary before joining the Candler School of Theology faculty from 1987 to 2010. O'Day assumed the deanship of the Wake Forest University School of Divinity from Bill J. Leonard in 2010. She resigned the position effective 30 June 2018. O'Day was diagnosed with glioblastoma in 2015, and died of the disease on 22 September 2018.

Selected works
 Revelation in the fourth Gospel : narrative mode and theological claim, 1986
 The Word disclosed : John's story and narrative preaching, 1987
 The Word disclosed : preaching the Gospel of John, 2002
 John, 2006
 Preaching the Revised common lectionary : a guide, 2007
 Theological Bible commentary, 2009

References

1954 births
2018 deaths
Deaths from brain cancer in the United States
Deaths from cancer in North Carolina
American biblical scholars
Wake Forest University faculty
Harvard Divinity School alumni
Brown University alumni
Emory University alumni
Emory University faculty
Hamilton College (New York) faculty
United Church of Christ ministers
American university and college faculty deans
People from Plainfield, New Jersey
People from Scituate, Massachusetts
People from Chappaqua, New York
20th-century American women writers
21st-century American women writers
Female biblical scholars
Women deans (academic)
People from Union County, New Jersey
American women academics